Zemah ben Hayyim, or sometimes Zemah b. Hayyim, was Gaon of Sura from 889 to 895.

He was the stepbrother and successor of Nahshon ben Zadok, and has become known especially through the reply which he made to the inquiry of the Kairwanites regarding Eldad ha-Dani. This responsum, which appeared in part in the first edition of the Shalshelet ha-Ḳabbalah (Venice, 1480), was republished as completely as possible by A. Epstein in Vienna in his Eldad ha-Dani. It embraces nine points and concludes with an apology for Eldad's forgetfulness. According to Epstein, only one other responsum by Ẓemaḥ has been published; it is given in the Constantinople edition of the Pardes, and ends with the same words as does the first-mentioned responsum: לנטות ימין ושמאל. I.H. Weiss, however, ascribes to this gaon also the authorship of responsa in Sha'arei Tzedek (iv., No. 14) and in the compilation Ḥemdah Genuzah (Nos. 58–61, 111-131). Nothing is known of the gaon's personal career.

References 
 Its bibliography:
A. Epstein, Eldad ha-Dani, pp. 6–10, Presburg, 1891;
Reifmann, in Ha-Karmel, viii., No. 32;
Monatsschrift, 1874, p. 553;
Z. Frankel, ib. 1878, p. 423;
Grätz, Gesch. v. 243-245;
Weiss, Dor, iv. 124, 264.

Geonim
9th-century rabbis
Year of death unknown
Rabbis of Academy of Sura
Year of birth unknown